Carlos, Prince of Asturias, also known as Don Carlos (8 July 154524 July 1568), was the eldest son and heir apparent of King Philip II of Spain. His mother was Maria Manuela of Portugal, daughter of John III of Portugal. Carlos was mentally unstable and was imprisoned by his father in early 1568, dying after half a year of solitary confinement. His fate was a theme in Spain's Black Legend, and inspired a play by Friedrich Schiller and an opera by Giuseppe Verdi.

Life
Carlos was born at Valladolid on 8 July 1545, the son of the double first cousins Philip of Spain and María Manuela of Portugal. His paternal grandfather, Emperor Charles V, was the reigning king of Spain. Carlos's mother Maria died four days after the birth of her son from a haemorrhage she had following the birth.

The young Infante Carlos was delicate and deformed. He grew up proud and willful and, as a young adult, began to show signs of mental instability. Many of his physical and psychological disabilities may have stemmed from the inbreeding common to his family, the House of Habsburg, and the royal houses of Portugal (House of Aviz) and Spain. Carlos had only four great-grandparents instead of the maximum of eight, and his parents had the same coefficient of co-ancestry (1/4) as if they were half siblings. He also had only six great-great-grandparents, instead of the maximum 16;  his maternal grandmother and his paternal grandfather were siblings, his maternal grandfather and his paternal grandmother were also siblings, and his two great-grandmothers were sisters.

Early years
Carlos lost his mother four days after his birth. He was raised by his aunts and, after their marriages, with other family members. According to the courtesan Gramiz, Carlos was spoiled, emotionally unstable, and not very bright. He was educated in the Universidad de Alcalá de Henares along with Juan of Austria and Alexander Farnese.

The descriptions of his behaviour suggest that he had serious mental problems. Rumour in the Spanish court had it that he enjoyed roasting animals alive and on one occasion blinded all the horses in the royal stables . At age eleven he ordered the whipping of a serving girl for no known reason. The Venetian ambassador, Hieronymo Soranzo, thought that Carlos was "ugly and repulsive" and once tried to force a shoemaker to eat shoes Carlos had found unsatisfactory. Another Venetian, Paolo Tiepolo, wrote: "He [Prince Carlos] wished neither to study nor to take physical exercise, but only to harm others."

José Luis Gonzalo Sánchez-Molero has tried to argue that those reports were just rumours, based on his investigations regarding Carlos's personal library – even though there is no guarantee that he read the books in it. From 1554, Juan was in charge of both his education and his library. His library was filled with books on Spanish history, Aragonese history, Portuguese history, mathematics, astronomy, and cartography. He had no books in Latin, which was strange given his age and rank, but he had various books in Portuguese and started learning German in 1566. It is suggested that the 1562 accident did not damage his intellectual ability, even though this is unclear.

In 1556, Emperor Charles V abdicated and retired to the Monastery of Yuste in southern Spain, leaving the Spanish holdings of his empire to his son, Philip, Carlos's father. The former emperor died in 1558, and the following year, Prince Carlos was betrothed to Elizabeth of Valois, eldest daughter of King Henry II of France. However, for political reasons, and his father's mistrust of Carlos's temper, she instead married his father, King Philip, in 1560.

His health was always weak. At age 14 he fell ill with malaria, which provoked severe deformations in his legs and spinal column. In 1561 the doctors of the court recommended that he move permanently to Alcalá de Henares for his health, as the climate was milder. Carlos constantly complained about his father's resistance to giving him positions of authority. Finally, the King gave him a position in the Council of Castile and another in the Council of Aragon. This only made Carlos more furious, since both organisations were important but ultimately consultative. He showed no interest in the councils or in familiarising himself with political matters through them.

Inheritance and head injury
Three other brides were then suggested for the Prince: Mary, Queen of Scots; Margaret of Valois, youngest daughter of Henry II of France; and Anna of Austria, who was later to become Philip's fourth wife, and was a daughter of Philip's cousin, Emperor Maximilian II and Philip's sister Maria. It was agreed in 1564 that Carlos should marry Anna. His father promised him rule over the Low Countries in 1559, before his accident, but Carlos's growing mental instability after it, along with his demonstrations of sadism, made his father hesitate and ultimately change his mind, which enraged Carlos further.

The 15-year-old Carlos was recognised in 1560 as the heir-apparent to the Castilian throne, and three years later as heir-apparent to the Crown of Aragon as well. Also, had he lived until the onset of the Portuguese succession crisis two decades later, he would have had a better claim to the Portuguese throne (in the aftermath of the extinction of the House of Aviz) than his father as he was the eldest surviving grandson of King John III of Portugal. Because of his eminence, he often attended meetings of the Council of State (which dealt with foreign affairs) and was in correspondence with his aunt Margaret, who governed the Low Countries in his father's name.

In 1562, he sustained a serious head injury falling downstairs while chasing a serving girl. The prince was close to death, in terrible pain and experiencing delusions. After trying all sorts of remedies, including doctors of all types, healers, and even the relics of Diego de Alcalá, his life was saved by a trepanation of the skull, performed by the eminent anatomist Andreas Vesalius. After his recovery, Carlos became even wilder, more unstable in his temper and unpredictable in his behaviour. His father was forced to move him away from any position of power. He took a dislike to the Duke of Alba, who became the commander of Philip's forces in the Netherlands, a position that had been promised to Carlos.

Insanity, treason and attempted patricide
His frustration and mental problems were useful for the rebel factions in the Low Countries. In 1565, Carlos made contacts with a representative of Count Egmont and Philip of Montmorency, from the Low Countries, who were among the leaders of the revolt against Philip. He planned on fleeing to the Netherlands and declaring himself king, with the support of the rebels. In one of his chaotic actions he confessed the plot to Ruy Gómez de Silva, Prince of Eboli, who loyally informed the king.

In 1566, Floris of Montmorency established new contacts with him in the name of Count Egmont and Philip of Montmorency, to repeat the previous plot.

In 1567, the prince gave new proofs of mental instability. During a walk, water thrown from a window accidentally splashed him. He ordered the house to be set on fire. He tried to stab and kill the Duke of Alba in public and in broad daylight. He tried to throw a servant who bothered him through the window of the highest floor of the palace, and also tried to kill a guard who had also displeased him that same year.

In the autumn of 1567, he made another attempt to flee to the Netherlands by asking John of Austria to take him to Italy. John was loyal to the king and aware of Carlos's mental state. He asked for 24 hours to think about it and used them to reveal  the plan to the king who immediately denied permission for the trip.

As a consequence, Carlos tried to murder John. He loaded his gun and called John of Austria to his room, where he tried to shoot him repeatedly. The attempted assassination was fruitless because one of the servants, knowing the prince full well, had discharged the gun while the prince called John. Carlos grew so irate that he tried to attack John with his bare hands. He eventually informed various people in court of his desire to murder the King. There is debate about whether he actually tried to do so. After that incident, Philip imprisoned the prince in his rooms without receiving correspondence and with limited contacts with the exterior world.

Just before midnight on 17 January 1568, Philip II, in armour, and with four councillors, entered Don Carlos' bedchamber in the Alcázar of Madrid where they declared his arrest, seized his papers and weapons, and nailed up the windows. Since Carlos threatened to take his own life, the king banned him from having knives or forks in his room. Carlos then tried to starve himself, but this also failed.

Death
When it came to explaining the situation to public opinion and European courts, Philip tried to explain his son's absence without disclosing his actual faults or mental condition, in hopes of an eventual recovery. This lack of transparency was used to fuel the anti-Imperial propaganda of William the Silent. On 24 July 1568, the prince died in his room, probably as the result of his delicate health. His death was used as one of the core elements of the Spanish Black Legend in the Netherlands, which needed to justify a revolt against the king. It was later claimed that he was poisoned on the orders of King Philip, especially by William in his Apology, a 1581 propaganda work against the Spanish king. The idea of the poisoning had been held by central and north European historians, based on the pieces of propaganda produced in the Netherlands, until the 20th century, while most Spanish and Italian historians kept claiming that evidence and documentation pointed at a death by natural causes. Modern historians now think that Don Carlos died of natural causes. Carlos grew very thin, and some had interpreted his hunger strikes as an eating disorder developed during his imprisonment, alternating self-starvation with heavy binges.

Legend and literature

The idea of King Philip confining and murdering his own son later played a minor role in establishing the anti-Spanish Black Legend in England, and a major one in forming it in the Netherlands, Germany and central Europe.  The propaganda created from it formed the basis for Friedrich Schiller's 1787 tragedy Don Karlos, Infant von Spanien.

Schiller based his work on a novel written in 1672 by the French Abbé, César Vichard de Saint-Réal, which was also the source used by the English writer Thomas Otway for his play Don Carlos, Prince of Spain. In both works, romantic tragedies that combine nationalism and romantic love, Carlos incarnates the ideal of the romantic knight, noble and brave. He is presented as the lover of young Elizabeth of Valois, Philip's wife, as they both fight for freedom and for their love against a cruel, despotic, merciless, and far-too-old-for-Isabel Philip II and his court of equally cruel and despotic Spaniards. Finally, the hero is defeated by treason due to his excess of nobility.

Schiller's play was adapted into several operas, most notably Giuseppe Verdi's Don Carlos (1867, also known under its Italian title, Don Carlo).  Verdi's opera is probably the version of the story most familiar to modern audiences, as it is a mainstay of the operatic repertoire and is still frequently performed.  In it, Carlos is portrayed sympathetically as a victim of court intrigues, and little reference is made to his mental instability or violent tendencies.

The story of a king jailing his own son is also the basis for the Spanish play La vida es sueño (Life Is a Dream) (1635), by Pedro Calderón de la Barca; however, this play does not explicitly refer to Don Carlos, starts with a different premise, and was likely inspired by a combination of religious reflection and Plato's cave, in the line of Spanish Neoplatonism.

In popular media
The role of Carlos is portrayed by Canadian actor Mark Ghanimé in the CW show Reign. He was portrayed as a sexual deviant, who enjoyed being whipped, and showed interest in ruling Scotland with a crown matrimonial. Reign does hold true to the facts of brain damage, but instead of a fall, Don Carlos's head is impaled by a piece of wood from his "sex horse".

Carlos is portrayed by Joseph Cuby as a 14 year old sadist betrothed to Princess Mariella (Francesca Annis) in the TV series Sir Francis Drake (1962) episode "Visit to Spain".

In Foxe's Book of Martyrs

John Foxe, in Actes and Monuments, better known as Foxe's Book of Martyrs (2nd ed., 1570), wrote about Don Carlos as follows:

Ancestry

Notes

References
Kamen, Henry: Philip of Spain. Yale University Press. 1998. 
Marshall, Peter: The Magic Circle of Rudolf II: Alchemy and Astrology in Renaissance Prague. Walker & Company. 2006. 
Parker, Geoffrey: Philip II: Fourth Edition. Open Court. 2002. 
Parker, Geoffrey: Imprudent King: A New Life of Philip II. Yale University Press. 2014.

External links

 Radiolab's program A Clockwork Miracle

1545 births
1568 deaths
16th-century Spanish people
Spanish people with disabilities
Spanish royalty
Princes of Asturias
Dukes of Montblanc
Spanish infantes
Heirs apparent who never acceded
Knights of the Golden Fleece
Burials in the Pantheon of Infantes at El Escorial
Deaths by starvation
Children of Philip II of Spain
Sons of kings
Non-inheriting heirs presumptive